Jean-Charles Gicquel (born 24 February 1967, in Ploërmel) is a retired high jumper from France, who set his personal best (2.35 m) on 13 March 1994 in Paris. He is a four-time national champion for France in the men's high jump event.

International competitions

References

1967 births
Living people
People from Ploërmel
French male high jumpers
World Athletics Championships athletes for France
Sportspeople from Morbihan
Mediterranean Games gold medalists for France
Mediterranean Games medalists in athletics
Athletes (track and field) at the 1991 Mediterranean Games
Athletes (track and field) at the 1993 Mediterranean Games
20th-century French people